Wlamir Marques (born July 16, 1936), also known simply as Wlamir, is a Brazilian former basketball player and coach. He is considered to be one of the best Brazilian basketball players of all time, and to have been one of the best players in the world during the 1960s. Alongside fellow countrymen Amaury Pasos, Algodão, and Rosa Branca, he led the best basketball generation Brazil ever had. At a height of 1.85 m (6'1") tall, he played at the small forward position. He was nicknamed "The Flying Saucer", and "The Blonde Devil".

Along with Kresimir Cosic, Marques is one of the top two medalists in FIBA World Cup history, having won 2 gold medals and 2 silver medals. He was named one of FIBA's 50 Greatest Players in 1991. The Ginásio Poliesportivo Wlamir Marques arena is named after him, in his honor.

Club career 
At the club level, Marques played as a junior with São Vicente, and at the senior level with XV de Novembro, S.C. Corinthians, and Tênis Clube Campinas. He won the Brazilian League in 1965, 1966, and 1969, with S.C. Corinthians. He won the FIBA Intercontinental Cup's 1965 Test Cup championship, a game in which he scored 51 points.

National team career 
Marques played for the senior men's Brazilian national team, and with them he won the 1959 FIBA World Championship and the 1963 FIBA World Championship gold medals. He was the MVP of the 1963 FIBA World Championship. He also won silver medals at the 1954 FIBA World Championship and 1970 FIBA World Championship.

He won bronze medals at the 1960 Summer Olympic Games and the 1964 Summer Olympic Games, a silver medal at the 1963 Pan American Games, and bronze medals at the 1955 Pan American Games and 1959 Pan American Games.

Post-playing career 
After his basketball playing career ended, Marques worked as a head basketball coach. He then worked as a sports commentator for basketball games on ESPN Brasil, and has been an active personality on the show called, "Brazilian Basketball Reborn", working as an important voice on TV and internet channels.

References

External links 
FIBA Profile
CBB Profile 

1936 births
Living people
Brazilian basketball coaches
Brazilian men's basketball players
1954 FIBA World Championship players
1959 FIBA World Championship players
1963 FIBA World Championship players
1970 FIBA World Championship players
Basketball players at the 1955 Pan American Games
Basketball players at the 1959 Pan American Games
Basketball players at the 1963 Pan American Games
Basketball players at the 1956 Summer Olympics
Basketball players at the 1960 Summer Olympics
Basketball players at the 1964 Summer Olympics
Basketball players at the 1968 Summer Olympics
FIBA World Championship-winning players
Medalists at the 1960 Summer Olympics
Medalists at the 1964 Summer Olympics
Olympic basketball players of Brazil
Olympic bronze medalists for Brazil
Olympic medalists in basketball
Pan American Games silver medalists for Brazil
Pan American Games bronze medalists for Brazil
Pan American Games medalists in basketball
People from São Vicente, São Paulo
Small forwards
Sociedade Esportiva Palmeiras basketball coaches
Sport Club Corinthians Paulista basketball coaches
Sport Club Corinthians Paulista basketball players
Medalists at the 1955 Pan American Games
Sportspeople from São Paulo (state)